Events in the year 1562 in Japan.

Incumbents
Monarch: Ōgimachi

Deaths
January 9 - Amago Haruhisa (b. 1514), warlord

References

 
1560s in Japan
Japan
Years of the 16th century in Japan